The flag of the British Indian Ocean Territory (BIOT) is similar to the flags of other British dependencies and colonies as it has the Union Flag in the upper hoist-side corner. The palm tree and crown are symbols of the Indian Ocean Territory. The Flag was initially intended to be used by the Commissioner but has gained semi-official status as a territorial flag for use on land.

Overview
The flag contains the Union Flag in its canton (upper hoist quarter). It depicts the waters of the Indian Ocean, where the islands are located, in the form of white and blue wavy lines. The flag also depicts a palm tree rising above the St Edward's Crown. It is understood that the flag, which was granted by Queen Elizabeth II on the 25th anniversary of the BIOT in 1990, is that of the Commissioner and has only semi-official status.

Given that it is impossible for civilians to visit the British Indian Ocean Territory, it is not clear how widely this flag is used. However, a video released by the Naval Support Facility on Diego Garcia shows a scene where the flag is being flown on land within the territory. The only settlements on the Islands are the Anglo-American naval and air facilities.

The flag does indeed fly at Diego Garcia, along with the American Flag. Both are lowered at the end of the duty day.

The Flag was designed for the Commissioner of the British Indian Ocean Territory. The Commissioner is based at the Foreign, Commonwealth and Development Office in London.

Other images

References

External links

National flags
Blue Ensigns
Flag
Indian Ocean
Flags introduced in 1990
British